Jozka Veselska was a female international table tennis player from Czechoslovakia.

She won two bronze medals; one at the 1933 World Table Tennis Championships in the women's doubles with Marie Walterova. and one in the women's team event at the 1934 World Table Tennis Championships.

See also
 List of table tennis players
 List of World Table Tennis Championships medalists

References

Czechoslovak table tennis players
World Table Tennis Championships medalists